A general election was held in the U.S. state of Wyoming on Tuesday, November 8, 1910. All of the state's executive officers—the Governor, Secretary of State, Auditor, Treasurer, and Superintendent of Public Instruction—were up for election. Former U.S. Senator Joseph M. Carey won the gubernatorial election, securing the first Democratic win for Governor since 1892. Democratic candidates unseated Republican incumbents in the elections for Secretary of State and Superintendent of Public Instruction, and Republicans narrowly held open seats in elections for State Auditor and Treasurer.

Governor

Incumbent Republican Governor Bryant B. Brooks declined to run for re-election. Former U.S. Senator Joseph M. Carey and Attorney General William E. Mullen were the leading Republican contenders, but Carey instead successfully received the Democratic nomination, and ran against Mullen in the general election. Carey defeated Mullen by a wide margin, the first Democratic gubernatorial victory since 1892.

Secretary of State
Incumbent Republican Secretary of State William R. Schnitger ran for re-election to a second term. Cody Mayor Frank L. Houx was nominated by acclamation at the Democratic convention as its nominee for Secretary of State. The contest between Schnitger and Houx was close, and initial vote tallies showed Houx up by several hundred votes, but the final count showed a considerably narrowed result, with Houx up just 37 votes. Nonetheless, Republicans did not contest Houx's election, and Schnitger conceded defeat.

General election

Results

Auditor
Incumbent Republican State Auditor LeRoy Grant declined to run for re-election to a fourth term. At the Republican convention, Robert Forsyth, a State Senator from Sweetwater County, was nominated over George Patterson, receiving 117 votes to Patterson's 59. Forsyth was then nominated by acclamation. In the general election, Senator Forsyth faced the Democratic nominee, George C. Forsythe, a Converse County Justice of the Peace. Forsyth ended up narrowly defeating Forsythe, winning by just 766 votes and a 2% margin.

General election

Results

Treasurer
Incumbent Republican Treasurer Edward Gillette was unable to seek re-election due to the state constitution's prohibition on state treasurers succeeding themselves. At the Republican convention, State Senator Joseph L. Baird was nominated after former State House Speaker Scott Snively and H. R. Weston both declined to seek the office. At the Democratic convention, Dr. Earl Whedon defeated former State Senator Leopold Kabis for the nomination, and advanced to the general election. In the general election, Baird narrowly defeated Whedon, winning by just 207 votes, or 0.56% of the vote.

General election

Results

Superintendent of Public Instruction
Incumbent Republican Superintendent Archibald D. Cook ran for re-election to a second term. At the Democratic convention, Weston County Superintendent of Schools Rose Bird was nominated as Cook's opponent. In the general election, Rose defeated Archibald, winning 49.5% of the vote to Cook's 45.9%.

General election

Results

References

 
Wyoming